ConnectedText (also abbreviated as CT) is a personal wiki which runs on Windows. Articles are written in plain text in CT's own markup language.  When viewing articles they are styled by a standard HTML CSS file.  The markup language contains many directives for classification and linkage and can also be scripted using the Python programming language.

The development of ConnectedText has now ceased.  The current version (6.0.15) will be the last.  It is still on sale but the developer has said that there will be no new features added.

Features
ConnectedText also features:

 Categories
 Outline view
 Semantic extensions
 Special date topics
 Plugins, to include:
 Python scripting
 Ploticus graphs
 Graphviz charts
 Sparklines
 Math formulas rendered using LaTeX
 Tables
 Drag and drop operations
 Clipboard catcher
 Version comparison
 Ability to display pages in a tree view, similar to Keynote
 Support to Asian code pages
 Ability to export the entire wiki to plain text, HTML or Microsoft Compressed HTML Help
 Support scripting languages (Python, Perl, VBScript, etc.)
 Support for USB drives
 Support several languages: English, Portuguese, Danish, Italian and German

See also
 Personal wiki

References

External links
 

Proprietary wiki software
Note-taking software
Windows-only software
Personal wikis
Personal information managers